Gladys Morcom (31 October 1918 – 18 January 2010) was a British swimmer. She competed in the women's 400 metre freestyle at the 1936 Summer Olympics. She also competed at the 1934 British Empire Games. She married Basil Lees in 1958 and became Gladys Lees and died in 2010.

References

1918 births
2010 deaths
British female swimmers
Olympic swimmers of Great Britain
Swimmers at the 1936 Summer Olympics
Sportspeople from Dudley
British female freestyle swimmers
Swimmers at the 1934 British Empire Games
Commonwealth Games competitors for England
20th-century British women